Nebuchadnezzar (Nabû-kudurri-uṣur) or Nebuchadrezzar was the name of four kings of Babylon:
 Nebuchadnezzar I ( 1125 – 1104 BC), known for his victory over Elam and the recovery of the Statue of Marduk
 Nebuchadnezzar II (605–562 BC), famous for his appearances in the Hebrew Bible
 Nebuchadnezzar III (522 BC), originally named Nidintu-Bêl, rebel against Darius I of Persia
 Nebuchadnezzar IV (521 BC), originally named Arakha, rebel against Darius I of Persia

It may also refer to:
 Nebuchadnezzar (governor of Uruk) - a governor of the city Uruk in the 640s BC, possibly ancestor of the later Nebuchadnezzar II
 Nebuchadnezzar (wine), a bottle that holds 15 litres of wine
 Nebuchadnezzar (Blake), a 1795 print by William Blake
 Nebuchadnezzar (video game), a 2021 city-building game
 Nebuchadnezzar (The Matrix), the name of Morpheus' vessel in the science fiction films The Matrix, The Matrix Reloaded and The Matrix Revolutions
 Nabucco (short for Nabucodonosor/ Nebuchadnezzar) an opera by Giuseppe Verdi

Human name disambiguation pages